Jonathan Patrick Cannon (born July 19, 2000) is an American professional baseball pitcher in the Chicago White Sox organization.

Amateur career
Cannon attended Centennial High School in Roswell, Georgia. In 2019, his senior season, he went 4-1 with a 0.51 ERA alongside batting .368 with two home runs. He went unselected in the 2019 Major League Baseball draft, and fulfilled his commitment to play college baseball at the University of Georgia.

In 2020, Cannon's freshman season at Georgia, he pitched  innings, striking out 12, walking two, and giving up no earned runs before the season was cancelled due to the COVID-19 pandemic. He spent the summer playing for the Gainesville Braves of the Sunbelt Baseball League, a team coached by Micah Owings. Cannon missed the beginning of the 2021 season while recovering from mononucleosis. He appeared in 13 games (12 starts) for the season, going 4-2 with a 3.98 ERA, 57 strikeouts, and 13 walks over  innings. He was considered a top prospect for the 2021 Major League Baseball draft, but went unselected. Following the season's end, he played collegiate summer baseball with the Orleans Firebirds of the Cape Cod Baseball League. For the 2022 season, Cannon was named Georgia's Opening Day starter. He missed time during the season due to a forearm injury. Over 13 starts for the season, he went 9-4 with a 4.02 ERA over  innings.

Professional career
Cannon was drafted by the Chicago White Sox in the third round with the 101st overall selection of the 2022 Major League Baseball draft. He signed with the team for $925,000. 

Cannon made his professional debut with the Arizona Complex League White Sox and was later promoted to the Kannapolis Cannon Ballers. Over  innings, he gave up one run while striking out four batters and walking three.

References

External links

Georgia Bulldogs bio

2000 births
Living people
Baseball players from Georgia (U.S. state)
Baseball pitchers
Georgia Bulldogs baseball players
Orleans Firebirds players
Arizona Complex League White Sox players
Kannapolis Cannon Ballers players